Ilya Velchev (born 25 February 1925) is a Bulgarian cyclist. He competed in three events at the 1952 Summer Olympics.

References

External links
 

1925 births
Possibly living people
Bulgarian male cyclists
Olympic cyclists of Bulgaria
Cyclists at the 1952 Summer Olympics